Acrossocheilus yalyensis is a species of ray-finned fish in the genus Acrossocheilus.

References

Yalyensis
Fish described in 2001